The 1988 United States Senate election in Hawaii took place on November 8, 1988. Incumbent Democratic U.S. Senator Spark Matsunaga won re-election to a third and final term.

On April 15, 1990, Senator Matsunaga died of bone cancer, leading Governor John Waihe'e to appoint United States House of Representatives 2nd district Daniel Akaka to fill the seat and ran in the 1990 special election to fill out the remainder of the term, but won for his full term.

Major candidates

Democratic 
 Spark Matsunaga, incumbent U.S. Senator

Republican 
 Maria Hustace, cattle rancher

Results

See also 
  1988 United States Senate elections

References

External links 

Hawaii
1988
United States Senate